The oersted (symbol Oe) is the coherent derived unit of the auxiliary magnetic field H in the centimetre–gram–second system of units (CGS). It is equivalent to 1 dyne per maxwell.

Difference between CGS and SI systems
In the CGS system, the unit of the H-field is the oersted and the unit of the B-field is the gauss. In the SI system, the unit ampere per meter (A/m), which is equivalent to newton per weber, is used for the H-field and the unit of tesla is used for the B-field.

History
The unit was established by the IEC in the 1930s  in honour of Danish physicist Hans Christian Ørsted. Ørsted discovered the connection between magnetism and electric current when a magnetic field produced by a current-carrying copper bar deflected a magnetised needle during a lecture demonstration.

Definition
The oersted is defined as a dyne per unit pole.

The H-field strength inside a long solenoid wound with 79.58 turns per meter of a wire carrying 1 A is approximately 1 oersted. The preceding statement is exactly correct if the solenoid considered is infinite in length with the current evenly distributed over its surface.

The oersted is closely related to the gauss (G), the CGS unit of magnetic flux density. In a vacuum, if the magnetizing field strength is 1 Oe, then the magnetic field density is 1 G, whereas, in a medium having permeability  (relative to permeability of vacuum), their relation is:

Because oersteds are used to measure magnetizing field strength, they are also related to the magnetomotive force (mmf) of current in a single-winding wire-loop:

Stored energy

The stored energy in a magnet, called magnet performance or maximum energy product (often abbreviated BHmax), is typically measured in units of megagauss-oersteds (MG⋅Oe).

See also
 Centimetre–gram–second system of units
 Ampere's model of magnetization

References

Centimetre–gram–second system of units
Units of magnetic induction